Phallus Dei is the debut album by German band Amon Düül II. The album was the result of the Amon Düül commune in Munich splitting. The album features layered guitars, abstract percussion, and chant-like vocals. It is often cited (alongside Can's Monster Movie) as the original Krautrock album.

It was first issued on CD in 1988 by the Mantra label. All known copies list the songs in incorrect order on the cover, but present them correctly on the disc itself, except for the 1993 Repertoire Records re-issue. It was reissued in 2001, digitally remastered by Eroc, and contained two extra tracks: "Freak Out Requiem (Parts I–IV)" and "Cymbals in the End".

The 2006 re-remastered reissue on the German label Revisited Records contains two bonus tracks: "TouchMaPhal" (10:17) and "I Want the Sun to Shine" (10:32). It does not contain the bonus material from the 2001 reissue.

Track listing
All tracks composed by Amon Düül II.

Personnel
Amon Düül II:

 Dieter Serfas – drums, electric cymbals
 Peter Leopold – drums
 Shrat (Christian Thiele) – bongos, vocals, violin
 Renate Knaup – vocals, tambourine
 John Weinzierl – guitar, 12-string, bass
 Chris Karrer – violin, guitar, twelve-string guitar, soprano saxophone, vocals
 Falk Rogner – organ
 Dave Anderson – bass

Guest musicians:
 Holger Trülzsch – Turkish drums
 Christian Borchard – vibraphone

Credits
 Gerd Stein – photography
 Olaf Kübler – producer

References

1969 debut albums
Amon Düül II albums
German-language albums